Kyle Thomas Vassell (born 7 February 1993) is a professional footballer who plays as a striker for Scottish Premiership side Kilmarnock. Born in England, he represents the Northern Ireland national team.

He began his career as a youth at Norwich City  and Brentford, before embarking on a nomadic period in non-League football. He made his Football League debut for Peterborough United in 2013 and thereafter notably played for Blackpool F.C. and Rotherham United. He is a distant relative of Darius and Isaac Vassell.

Club career

Early years
Vassell began his career as a schoolboy at Norwich City and joined Brentford at age 15 after having difficulty with commuting from his London home to Norfolk. He later acknowledged that at the time he found the change of clubs difficult to comprehend. He failed to feature in the first team while at Brentford and spent work experience loan spells at Conference South sides Woking and St Albans City during the 2010–11 season. He was released by Brentford in June 2011 after he completed his two-year scholarship and later felt that he had given away his opportunity at being a professional footballer.

Dover Athletic
Following interest from Gillingham and Burton Albion and an unsuccessful trial with League Two side Crewe Alexandra, Vassell signed non-contract terms with Conference South side Dover Athletic in October 2011, linking up with former Brentford manager and player Nicky Forster. He scored on his debut against in a 6–3 Kent Senior Cup win over Maidstone United on 12 October. He made three further appearances before leaving the club.

Sutton United, dual-registrations and loan
Vassell signed non-contract terms with Conference South side Sutton United on 30 November 2011 and scored on his debut in a 1–0 Surrey Senior Cup win over Epsom & Ewell on 6 December. Vassell bagged four goals in a 6–0 Surrey Senior Cup win over Godalming Town on 17 January 2012. In December 2011 and January 2012, Vassell had dual-registration spells with Isthmian League Premier Division side Tooting & Mitcham United and Isthmian League Division One South side Whitehawk respectively. He signed for Conference South side Staines Town on loan on 21 March 2012. During the  2011–12 season, he made fifteen Sutton appearances, scored seven goals and helped the club into the Conference South playoffs, where they were knocked out in the semi-finals by Welling United. Vassell made 17 appearances and scored three goals for Sutton during the early months of the 2012–13 season before leaving the club in November 2012.

Chelmsford City
Vassell signed for Conference South side Chelmsford City on 6 December 2012. He scored his first goal for the club on his second appearance in a 2–1 league victory over Boreham Wood on 29 December. From early January 2013 to early February, he was in fine form and bagged five goals in five games. He helped secure a fifth-place finish for Chelmsford, but he suffered playoff heartbreak for the second season running as Chelmsford were beaten in the semi-finals by the eventual promoted team Salisbury City. He finished the season having made 25 appearances and scored seven goals, despite being utilised predominantly in a wide midfield role.

Bishop's Stortford
Vassell signed for Chelmsford City's neighbours and divisional rivals Bishop's Stortford on 30 June 2013. He scored a hattrick in his first competitive game for the club, a 6–1 Herts Charity Cup win over Ware on 1 August. Vassell scored his first league goal for Bishop's Stortford in a 2–2 draw with Boreham Wood on 19 August. Vassell bagged four goals in 17 minutes in a 5–0 FA Cup second qualifying round win over Hendon on 29 September, which saw him receive an FA Cup Player Of The Round nomination. Another hattrick followed for Vassell in the FA Cup third qualifying round in a 6–1 victory over Chipstead. Vassell's run of 16 goals in 16 games saw him hailed as "the new Dwight Gayle" (after Gayle secured a move to League One with Peterborough United and subsequently Premier League side Crystal Palace the previous year on the back of a prolific goalscoring spell for Bishop's Stortford), though Vassell dismissed the comparison. Vassell was the subject of national attention when Bishop's Stortford's FA Cup first round tie with League Two side Northampton Town was chosen to be screened by ITV. Vassell started the match on 10 November, but suffered a dead leg early in the second half and was substituted as Northampton ran out 2–1 winners. It was his last appearance for the club.

Peterborough United
After his goalscoring exploits for Bishop's Stortford led to interest from Football League clubs, Vassell signed a two-and-a-half-year deal with League One side Peterborough United for an undisclosed fee on 11 November 2013. Vassell made his Peterborough debut (his first appearance in the Football League) on 24 November, starting in a 1–0 home league defeat to Stevenage. He was replaced by Shaun Jeffers after 71 minutes. Vassell was an unused substitute for a 3–2 league defeat to former club Brentford on 26 November and his third Posh appearance came in the return fixture on 1 January 2014. He replaced Mark Little after 76 minutes of the 3–1 defeat. Vassell scored his first goal for the club in a 2–2 Football League Trophy Southern Area Final first leg draw at home to Swindon Town on 5 February.

Vassell later spent time on loan at Dagenham & Redbridge, before joining Shrewsbury Town on loan for the rest of the season in January 2016.

He was released by Peterborough at the end of his contract in May 2016.

Blackpool
On 16 June 2016 it was confirmed Vassell had signed a one-year contract to play for League Two side Blackpool. On 6 August 2016 he scored on his League debut for Blackpool, against Exeter City.

Rotherham United
In July 2018, Vassell signed a three-year deal with Championship side Rotherham United. His first league goal for the club came over a year later; an acrobatic strike against Peterborough United in the League One game on 29 December 2019. On 15 January 2021, Vassell joined League One side Fleetwood Town on loan for the remainder of the 2020-21 season. On 17 May 2021, Rotherham United published their retained list, and confirmed Vassell would be leaving the club at the end of his contract.

Cheltenham Town
On 9 August 2021, Vassell signed a 1 year contract with League Two Champions, Cheltenham Town for their League One campaign. On 6 January 2022, Vassell left the club midway through his contract.

San Diego Loyal
Vassell moved overseas for the first time in his career on 17 January 2022, signing with USL Championship club San Diego Loyal SC. He was released by San Diego following the 2022 season.

Kilmarnock 
On 1 January 2023, Vassell signed with Scottish Premiership club Kilmarnock on a deal until the end of the season.

International career
In October 2018, Kyle Vassell was called up to the Northern Ireland squad for the first time, for their Nations League matches away to Austria and Bosnia-Herzegovina. Qualifying for Northern Ireland as his grandfather was from County Fermanagh, on his call up, Vassell said: "I'm over the moon, it has been a while coming, I'm grateful that my opportunity has come and it's my first ever call-up, so I'm really excited." On 12 October he made his debut against Austria, coming on as a substitute in the 77th minute.

Career statistics

Honours
Blackpool
EFL League Two play-offs: 2017

References

External links
 

1993 births
Living people
People from Milton Keynes
Association footballers from Northern Ireland
Northern Ireland international footballers
English footballers
English people of Northern Ireland descent
Association football forwards
Black British sportsmen
Brentford F.C. players
Woking F.C. players
St Albans City F.C. players
Dover Athletic F.C. players
Sutton United F.C. players
Tooting & Mitcham United F.C. players
Whitehawk F.C. players
Staines Town F.C. players
Chelmsford City F.C. players
Bishop's Stortford F.C. players
Peterborough United F.C. players
Oxford United F.C. players
Dagenham & Redbridge F.C. players
Shrewsbury Town F.C. players
Blackpool F.C. players
Rotherham United F.C. players
Fleetwood Town F.C. players
Cheltenham Town F.C. players
English Football League players
National League (English football) players
Isthmian League players
San Diego Loyal SC players
English expatriate footballers
English expatriate sportspeople in the United States
Expatriate soccer players in the United States
Footballers from Buckinghamshire
Kilmarnock F.C. players
Scottish Professional Football League players